Gareth Morgan (born 22 March 1977) is a South African politician and a former member of parliament with the opposition Democratic Alliance. He is a former Rhodes Scholar at Oxford, and previously worked as South Africa's Shadow Minister of Water and Environmental Affairs. He was South Africa's first carbon neutral Member of Parliament. He resigned from office in January 2013 to pursue a career in consulting., before joining the City of Cape Town as Principal Trade and Investment Officer in June 2015.

Education

Morgan matriculated from Westville Boys' High School in 1994 and completed a B.Com and political science honours degree at the University of Natal. He joined the Democratic Alliance's predecessor, the Democratic Party, in 1995—as a student activist. In 1999 he became the party's media officer in KwaZulu-Natal. After a brief stint as a high school teacher, Morgan read for a PPE degree and an M.Sc in Environmental Change and Management at Oxford—on a Rhodes Scholarship.

Member of Parliament

Upon his return to South Africa, Morgan was elected to the National Assembly on the DA's KwaZulu-Natal list. He was initially appointed Parliamentary Counsellor to the Leader of the Opposition—a position he occupied for 14 months. He subsequently was appointed spokesperson on Environmental Affairs. In July 2006 he became health spokesperson, before returning to the Environmental Affairs portfolio. Ahead of the 2009 General Elections he appeared second on the party's KwaZulu-Natal list and was re-elected. He served as Shadow Minister of Water and Environmental Affairs from 2009 to January 2013  and was a whip of the National Assembly from June 2011 until his resignation.

Constituency

Morgan served as Democratic Alliance MP for the Abaqulusi constituency in northern KwaZulu-Natal between 2004 and 2006. Between 2006 and 2008 he served the South Durban constituency, and from 2009 to January 2013 he served as constituency MP for Durban West.

Memberships

Morgan was a member of Globe International's G8+5 Climate Dialogue from 2006 to 2013.

He is also a fellow of the Emerging Leaders' Programme run by the Southern Africa Centre for Leadership and Public Values.

References

Offices held

1977 births
Living people
Politicians from Cape Town
White South African people
South African people of Welsh descent
Democratic Party (South Africa) politicians
Democratic Alliance (South Africa) politicians
Members of the National Assembly of South Africa
University of Natal alumni